The 1969  Houston Oilers season was the tenth and final season for the Houston Oilers as a professional AFL franchise before moving to the National Football League when the two merged. The team equaled their 1968 record of 7–7 (.500), finishing 6–6–2. They qualified for the playoffs but lost in the Divisional Round to the Oakland Raiders.

Roster

Season schedule

Game summaries

Week 1
The Oilers opened the season at Oakland–Alameda County Coliseum and fell behind the Raiders 14–0 in the first quarter.  They scored 17 points the next three quarters, but Daryle Lamonica unloaded a 64-yard touchdown to Warren Wells for the 21–17 Raiders win.  Pete Beathard had one touchdown but also two interceptions

Week 2

    
    
    
    

The Oilers intercepted Jack Kemp three times and limited him to 99 passing yards as they scored on Alvin Reed's 12-yard touchdown catch, a Roy Gerela field goal, and Hoyle Granger score.

Week 3
Roy Gerela booted five field goals as the Oilers' home opener at the Astrodome was a 22–10 win over the Dolphins.  Bob Griese had one touchdown, one interception, and was sacked five times.

Week 4
The Oilers faced Buffalo for the second time in three weeks and scored a touchdown in each quarter, winning 28–14.  Jack Kemp threw for 223 yards, nearly reaching Houston's total offensive output of 252 yards.

Week 5
The Oilers traveled to Kansas City but came out with a shutout loss.   The game saw a combined seventeen turnovers and just 345 combined yards of offense as the Chiefs put up 24 points for the 24–0 win.

Week 6
A full year before the debut of Monday Night Football the defending champion Jets hosted the Oilers on Monday Night and ground out a 23–17 win.  Both teams combined for six turnovers (Zeke Moore put up Houston's first touchdown returning a Joe Namath pick in the second quarter) as Namath (306 passing yards) came out on top of Pete Beathard's 314 yards.

Week 7
With both teams at 3–3 the Oilers returned to the Astrodome to face Lou Saban and the Broncos.  The game lead tied or changed on every score; the Oilers took a 14–7 lead in the second before Denver tied it at halftime; the Broncos then scored in the third on Floyd Little's three-yard run; in the fourth Roy Hopkins of the Oilers broke through for a 43-yard touchdown, then the Oilers won on Roy Gerela's 22-yard field goal and the 24–21 final.

Playoffs

Standings

References

Houston Oilers seasons
Houston Oilers
Houston